The Golden Sheaf Award for best Drama production is presented by the Yorkton Film Festival.

History
In 1947 the Yorkton Film Council was founded.  The first Yorkton Film Festival was held in 1950  During the first few festivals, the films were adjudicated by audience participation through ballot casting and winners were awarded 'Certificates of Merit' by the film council.  In 1958 the film council established the Yorkton Film Festival Golden Sheaf Award for the category 'Best of Festival', awarded to the best overall film of the festival.  As of 2020, the Golden Sheaf Award categories included: Main Entry Categories, Accompanying Categories, Craft Categories, and Special Awards.  

In 1984 the Golden Sheaf Award for best Drama was added to the main categories.  The winner of this award is determined by a panel of jurors chosen by the film council to select the best film that is primarily centered on a dramatic portrayal of characters, settings, life situations and stories.

Winners

1980s

1990s

2000s

2010s

2020s

References 

Awards established in 1984
Yorkton Film Festival awards